DR Studios (formerly known as Deep Red Games) is a British video game developer based in Milton Keynes in the United Kingdom. DRS primarily develops strategy games, such as Monopoly Tycoon. The company was formed in 1998 by Kevin Buckner and Clive Robert, and since then they have released more than fifteen games. In 2007, following a management buyout, the company name was changed to DR Studios.

Titles 
Risk II (2000)
Monopoly Tycoon (2001)
Beach Life (2002)
SeaWorld Adventure Parks Tycoon (2003)
SeaWorld Adventure Parks Tycoon 2 (2005)
Tycoon City: New York (2006)
Vegas: Make it Big/Vega$ Tycoon, Make it Big is the European Name & Tycoon for the US (2006)
Hospital Tycoon (2007)
High School Dreams: Best Friends Forever (2010)
Dragons Den (2011)
Bug Wings (2011)
My Sea Park (2012)
iSchool Dreams: First Semester (2012)
iSchool Dreams: My Valentine (2012)
Battle Islands (2013)
Mythic Islands (2014)
Battle Ages (2016)
Battle Islands: Commanders (2016)
Terraria (Mobile) (2019)

References

External links 
 
 

Video game companies established in 1998
Video game development companies
Video game companies of the United Kingdom
Companies based in Milton Keynes
British companies established in 1998
1998 establishments in England